Year 205 (CCV) was a common year starting on Tuesday (link will display the full calendar) of the Julian calendar. At the time, it was known as the Year of the Consulship of Aurelius and Geta (or, less frequently, year 958 Ab urbe condita). The denomination 205 for this year has been used since the early medieval period, when the Anno Domini calendar era became the prevalent method in Europe for naming years.

Events 
 By place 
 Roman Empire 
 Marcus Aurelius Antoninus Augustus and his brother Publius Septimius Geta Caesar become Roman Consuls.
 Hadrian's Wall is restored, after heavy raids by Caledonian tribes had overrun much of northern Britain.
 January 22 – Gaius Fulvius Plautianus, a praetorian prefect and father-in-law of Caracalla, is assassinated.
 Aemilius Papinianus becomes praetorian prefect, after the death of Gaius Fulvius Plautianus.

 China 
 Battle of Nanpi: Warlord Cao Cao defeats and kills Yuan Tan, the eldest son of his rival Yuan Shao.

Births 
 Cao Rui, Chinese emperor of Cao Wei (d. 239)
 Gu Tan, Chinese official and politician (d. 246)
 Plotinus, Greek philosopher and writer (d. 270)
 Shan Tao, Chinese Taoist scholar and official (d. 283)
 Sima Wang, Chinese prince and general (d. 271)
 Zhang Xiu (or Shusi), Chinese general (d. 245)

Deaths 
 January 22 – Gaius Fulvius Plautianus, Roman consul
 Guo Tu (or Gongze), Chinese official and politician 
 Marcus Peducaeus Plautius Quintillus, Roman consul
 Popilius Pedo Apronianus, Roman politician
 Yuan Tan, Chinese general and warlord

References